John Letts (born May 11, 1964), is a former professional tennis player from the United States.  He enjoyed most of his tennis success while playing doubles.  During his career, he won seven ATP tour doubles titles and reached four ATP tour doubles finals.  He also reached the quarterfinals of the 1985 Australian Open in doubles knocking out the 3rd seeded team of Tomáš Šmíd and John Fitzgerald in the second round.

Born in Houston, Texas, Letts grew up in Southern California.

The 1982 U.S. National Champion for boys 18 & under, Letts received a full scholarship to Stanford University, where he was a two time All-American and member of two NCAA championship teams.  At Stanford, he partnered with three doubles players who later reached the top five in the world: Scott Davis, Jim Grabb, and Patrick McEnroe.

He reached a high of No. 244 in the world in singles achieving most of his success on the ATP Challenger Tour including the semifinals of Manchester (1989) and San Luis Potosí (1988) and the quarterfinals of Nagoya (1988) and Dublin (1989).  In Grand Slam singles, he reached the second round of 1987 Australian Open before losing to eventual champion Stefan Edberg in four sets.  He played the opening match on the grandstand court at the new Australian Open facility in 1988 at Melbourne Park, losing to Australian Todd Woodbridge in 3 sets.  A torn rotator cuff suffered in 1989 eventually ended Letts' playing career.

Letts attended law school and graduated cum laude from the Northwestern University School of Law in 1994.  He practiced intellectual property law for Brinks, Hofer, Gilson & Lione in Chicago from 1994 to 1998.

In 1999, Letts founded iTennis, Inc., a tennis coaching and management company in Southern California.

His older sister, Elizabeth, is a #1 New York Times Best-Selling author.

ATP career finals

Doubles: 4 (1 title, 3 runner-ups)

ATP Challenger and ITF Futures finals

Doubles: 3 (2–1)

Performance timeline

Doubles

External links
 
 
 Stanford Tennis All Americans
 iTennis

American male tennis players
Northwestern University Pritzker School of Law alumni
Stanford Cardinal men's tennis players
Tennis players from Houston
1964 births
Living people